954 Li is a Themistian asteroid.

It was discovered by Karl Wilhelm Reinmuth in 1921 and was named after his wife Lina Alstede Reinmuth, who also had 955 Alstede named after her.

It has the second-shortest name of any minor planet, bested only by 85 Io.

References

External links 
 
 

000954
Discoveries by Karl Wilhelm Reinmuth
Named minor planets
000954
19210804